Mahamoud Farah (born 4 September 1988) is a Djiboutian middle-distance runner who specializes in the 800 and 1500 metres.

He competed at the 2007 World Championships and the 2008 Olympic Games without progressing to the second round.

His personal best times are:
800 metres - 1:47.53 min (2007)
1500 metres - 3:39.29 min (2008)

References

1988 births
Living people
Djiboutian male middle-distance runners
Athletes (track and field) at the 2008 Summer Olympics
Olympic athletes of Djibouti
World Athletics Championships athletes for Djibouti